Hadroplontus is a genus of minute seed weevils in the family of beetles known as Curculionidae. There are at least two described species in Hadroplontus.

Species
These two species belong to the genus Hadroplontus:
 Hadroplontus litura (Fabricius, 1775) c g b (Canada thistle stem weevil)
 Hadroplontus trimaculatus (Fabricius, J.C., 1775) c g
Data sources: i = ITIS, c = Catalogue of Life, g = GBIF, b = Bugguide.net

References

Further reading

External links

 

Ceutorhynchini